|}

Dmitri Vladimirovich Daschinski (born November 9, 1977 in Minsk), is a Belarusian freestyle skier. He is a four-time Olympian and two-time Olympic medalist in freestyle aerials, winning bronze at the 1998 Winter Olympics in Nagano, Japan, and silver in the 2006 Winter Olympics in Turin, Italy. He also placed 7th in the 2002 Winter Olympics in Salt Lake City, USA and 11th in the 2010 Winter Olympics in Vancouver, Canada. Daschinski was the first man to win two Olympic medals in freestyle aerials. In addition to his Olympic accomplishments, Daschinski finished 1st in the 2006 Men's Overall World Cup Standings. He also competed in 7 consecutive World Championships, winning silver at both the 2001 FIS Freestyle World Ski Championships in Whistler, Canada and 2007 FIS Freestyle World Ski Championships in Madonna di Campiglio.

External links
 

Belarusian male freestyle skiers
Living people
Sportspeople from Minsk
Freestyle skiers at the 1998 Winter Olympics
Freestyle skiers at the 2002 Winter Olympics
Freestyle skiers at the 2006 Winter Olympics
Freestyle skiers at the 2010 Winter Olympics
Freestyle skiers at the 2014 Winter Olympics
Olympic silver medalists for Belarus
Olympic bronze medalists for Belarus
Olympic freestyle skiers of Belarus
1977 births
Olympic medalists in freestyle skiing
Medalists at the 2006 Winter Olympics
Medalists at the 1998 Winter Olympics